Arakelots Monastery is a 13th-century monastery about  southwest of the village of Kirants in the Tavush Province of Armenia. The monastic complex sits upon the crest of a hill surrounded by a dense forest on the left bank of the Kunen River.

Approximately  downhill from the monastery are the ruins of a caravanserai. The ruins of a chapel sit on the next hill as well. Supposedly, two kilometers northeast of Arakelots Vank on a flat area on the mountain ridge is the little church and khachkar of Khndzorut.

Gallery

See also 

External links 

 Armeniapedia.org: Arakelots Monastery

Christian monasteries in Armenia
Buildings and structures in Tavush Province